Mike Ferreira (1955–2014) was a speedway rider from Zimbabwe.

Speedway career 
Ferreira rode in the top two tiers of British Speedway from 1974 to 1985, riding for various clubs. In 1981, he became the National League Riders' Champion.

He reached the final of the British Speedway Championship in 1982.

References 

1955 births
2014 deaths
British speedway riders
Canterbury Crusaders riders
Exeter Falcons riders
Swindon Robins riders
Wimbledon Dons riders
Sportspeople from Harare